Doris Svedlund (11 December 1926 – 7 September 1985) was a Swedish film actress. She starred in Ingmar Bergman's 1948 film Prison, and in the 1951 film Divorced, which Bergman wrote.

Partial filmography
 When the Meadows Blossom (1946)
 Prison (1949)
 Vagabond Blacksmiths (1949)
 Bohus Battalion (1949)
 The White Cat (1950)
 Divorced (1951)
 Love (1952)
 Blondie, Beef and the Banana (1952)
 Encounter with Life (1952)
 Café Lunchrasten (1954)
 Our Father and the Gypsy (1954)
 Violence (1955)
 Paradise (1955)
 Moon Over Hellesta (1956)
 Encounters in the Twilight (1957)

References

External links

1926 births
1985 deaths
20th-century Swedish actresses